Robert Bennet (23 July 1879 – 9 April 1962) was a New Zealand rugby union player who represented the All Blacks in 1905. His position of choice was centre three-quarter.

Bennet was born in Caversham (now a suburb of Dunedin) in 1879. He was educated at Albany Street School in Dunedin.

Career 
Bennet played for the Alhambra club and appeared for the Otago province 36 times in his career.

He played just once for the New Zealand national side in the test match against Australia in 1905. His selection was aided by the fact that the Original All Blacks had left the country and were unavailable. This match was won 14–3. Bennet did not score any points.

He continued playing club and provincial rugby until 1911.

Personal and death 
Bennet was a tailor and had a wife named Elizabeth. He died in Dunedin in 1962 and was buried at Andersons Bay Cemetery.

References 

1879 births
1962 deaths
New Zealand rugby union players
New Zealand international rugby union players
Rugby union players from Dunedin
Burials at Andersons Bay Cemetery
Rugby union centres
Otago rugby union players